Peter John Koegel (July 31, 1947 – February 4, 2023) was an American Major League Baseball first baseman, catcher, and outfielder. Koegel was drafted in the fourth round of the 1965 Major League Baseball Draft by the Kansas City Athletics out of Seaford High School (New York). He remained in the organization through its move to Oakland, California before being traded along with Bob Meyer to the Seattle Pilots for Fred Talbot in 1969. Koegel again remained in an organization through a move, this time when the Pilots moved to Milwaukee, Wisconsin to become the Milwaukee Brewers. During his time with the Brewers, Koegel played at the Major League level with the team in 1970 and in 1971 before being dealt along with Ray Peters to the Philadelphia Phillies for Johnny Briggs on April 22, 1971. Koegel played at the Major League level with the Phillies that year, as well as the following year. In 1973, he was traded to the Pittsburgh Pirates for Chris Zachary, but never played a Major League game with the organization.

Koegel died in Kingston, New York, on February 4, 2023, at the age of 75.

References

External links

Pete Koegel at Baseball Gauge
Pete Koegel at Pura Pelota (Venezuelan Professional Baseball League)

1947 births
2023 deaths
American expatriate baseball players in Mexico
Arizona Instructional League Athletics players
Arizona Instructional League Pilots players
Baseball players from New York (state)
Birmingham A's players
Burlington Bees players
Cardenales de Lara players
Charleston Charlies players
Eugene Emeralds players
Jacksonville Suns players
Leones del Caracas players
American expatriate baseball players in Venezuela
Major League Baseball catchers
Major League Baseball first basemen
Major League Baseball outfielders
Milwaukee Brewers players
Omaha Royals players
Peninsula Grays players
People from Mineola, New York
Petroleros de Poza Rica players
Philadelphia Phillies players
Portland Beavers players